Kyung Sung-hyun (born June 10, 1990 in Seoul, South Korea) is an alpine skier from South Korea. He competed for South Korea at the 2014 Winter Olympics in the alpine skiing events.

References

1990 births
Living people
Olympic alpine skiers of South Korea
Alpine skiers at the 2014 Winter Olympics
South Korean male alpine skiers
Sportspeople from Seoul
Alpine skiers at the 2017 Asian Winter Games
21st-century South Korean people